A light pillar is an atmospheric optical phenomenon in which a vertical beam of light appears to extend above and/or below a light source. The effect is created by the reflection of light from tiny ice crystals that are suspended in the atmosphere or that comprise high-altitude clouds (e.g. cirrostratus or cirrus clouds). If the light comes from the Sun (usually when it is near or even below the horizon), the phenomenon is called a sun pillar or solar pillar. Light pillars can also be caused by the Moon or terrestrial sources, such as streetlights and erupting volcanoes.

Formation 

Since they are caused by the interaction of light with ice crystals, light pillars belong to the family of halos. The crystals responsible for light pillars usually consist of flat, hexagonal plates, which tend to orient themselves more or less horizontally as they fall through the air. Each flake acts as a tiny mirror which reflects light sources that are appropriately positioned below it (see drawing), and the presence of flakes at a spread of altitudes causes the reflection to be elongated vertically into a column. The larger and more numerous the crystals, the more pronounced this effect becomes. More rarely, column-shaped crystals can cause light pillars as well. In very cold weather, the ice crystals can be suspended near the ground, in which case they are referred to as diamond dust.

Unlike a light beam, a light pillar is not physically located above or below the light source. Its appearance as a vertical line is an optical illusion, resulting from the collective reflection off the ice crystals; but only those that are in the common vertical plane, direct the light rays towards the observer (See drawing). This is similar to viewing a light source on a body of water.  Ripples on the surface of the water reflect the light source in many directions, and those that happen to be aimed at the viewer, combine to form a bright line pointing toward the light source.

Images

See also 
 Crepuscular rays
 Diamond dust
 Halo
 Light beam
 Sun dog
 Crown flash
 False sunrise
 False sunset

References

External links 

 Pillars. Atmospheric Optics. Explanations (10 pages) and many images.
 Light Pillars: An Introduction to Sun Pillars and Related Phenomena. The Weather Doctor's Weather Eyes.  Another nice explanation, all on one page
 Fabulous frozen frames – Sydney Morning Herald. November 1, 2006
 A Sun Pillar Over North Carolina.  NASA Astronomy Picture of the Day, 15 December 2008

Atmospheric optical phenomena
Pillar
Light sources